The Nihon Gaishi (日本外史) is a 19th-century book on the history of Japan by Rai San'yo. The whole work comprises 22 scrolls and covers samurai history from the Genpei War to the Edo period.

References

External links

日本外史繁體版
:zh:s:重訂日本外史

Edo-period works

Confucianism in Japan
Edo-period history books